Ignaz is a male given name, related to the name Ignatius. Notable people with this name include:

 Franz Ignaz Beck (1734–1807), German musician
 Heinrich Ignaz Franz Biber (1644–1704), Bohemian-Austrian musician
 Ignaz Brüll (1846–1907), Moravian-born pianist and composer who lived and worked in Vienna
 Ignaz Bösendorfer (1796–1859), Austrian musician and piano manufacturer
 Ignaz Franz Castelli (1780–1862), Austrian dramatist
 Ignaz Döllinger (1770–1841), German doctor, anatomist and physiologist
 Ignaz Aurelius Fessler (1756–1839), Hungarian ecclesiastic, politician, historian
 Ignaz Friedman (1882–1948), Polish pianist and composer
 Ignaz Fränzl (1736–1811), German violinist, composer
 Ignaz Günther (1725–1775), German sculptor and woodcarver
 Ignaz Holzbauer (1711–1783), German composer
 Ignaz Kirchner (1946–2018), German actor
 Ignaz Maybaum (1897–1976), rabbi and Jewish theologian
 Ignaz Moscheles (1794–1870), Bohemian composer
 Ignaz Pleyel (1757–1831), Austrian-born French composer
 Ignaz Puschnik (1934–2020), Austrian football player
 Ignaz Schiffermüller (1727–1806), Austrian naturalist
 Ignaz Rudolph Schiner (1813–1873), Austrian entomologist
 Ignaz Schuppanzigh (1776–1830), Austrian violinist
 Ignaz Schwinn (1860–1948), German-American bicycle manufacturer
 Ignaz Seipel (1876–1932), Austrian prelate and politician
 Ignaz Semmelweis (1818–1865), Hungarian physician
 Ignaz Friedrich Tausch (1793–1848), Bohemian botanist
 Ignaz Trebitsch-Lincoln (1879–1943), Hungarian adventurer and convicted con artist
 Ignaz Venetz (1788–1859), Swiss engineer, naturalist, and glaciologist
 Ignaz von Born (1742–1791), Austrian mineralogist and metallurgist
 Ignaz von Döllinger (1799–1890), German theologian
 Ignaz von Olfers (1793–1871), German naturalist, historian and diplomat
 Ignaz von Plener (1810–1908), Austrian statesman
 Ignaz von Rudhart (1790–1838), Bavarian scholar
 Ignaz von Seyfried (1776–1841), Austrian musician, conductor and composer
 Ignaz von Szyszyłowicz (1857–1910), Polish botanist
 Ignaz Heinrich von Wessenberg (1774–1860), German writer and scholar

See also
 Ignác
 Ignatz
 Ignatius

German masculine given names